Jan Ehrenwald (13 March 1900 – 15 June 1988) was a Czech-American psychiatrist and psychotherapist, most known for his work in the field of parapsychology. His work largely focused on extrasensory perception and its supposed implications for psychoanalysis.

Career

Ehrenwald studied medicine at the University of Prague. He taught psychiatry at the University of Vienna (1927-1931), University Hospital of Brooklyn at Long Island College Hospital (1948-1950) and State University of New York (1950-1953). He was a member of the Society for Psychical Research and was a fellow of the New York Academy of Medicine.

Reception

Ehrenwald's belief that telepathy had been successfully demonstrated was not accepted by the scientific community. Critics state that Ehrenwald's statements were based on conjecture, not solid facts.

His research was well received by parapsychologists. Arthur Deikman, J. B. Rhine and Ian Stevenson have positively reviewed Ehrenwald's books.

Works 
 Telepathy and Medical Psychology, W. W. Norton, 1948
 From Medicine Man to Freud, 1956
 Psychotherapy: Myth and Method, 1966
 New Dimensions of Deep Analysis, 1975
 History of Psychotherapy: From Magic Healing to Encounter, Jason Aronson, 1976
 The ESP Experience: A Psychiatric Validation, 1978

References 

1900 births
1988 deaths
American people of Czech descent
American psychiatrists
Czechoslovak emigrants to the United States
Parapsychologists